The Turnê 15 anos is the headlining concert tour by Brazilian girl group Rouge, in celebration to the fifteen years of existence of the group, supporting all four releases: Rouge (2002), C'est La Vie (2003), Blá Blá Blá (2004) and Mil e Uma Noites (2005). It began on January 27, 2018, in Fortaleza, Ceará and concluded on August 11, 2018, in Recife, Pernambuco.

Advertisement

On November 22, 2017, it was announced on the Blog Reporter Entre Linhas do Ceará newspaper The People that the Rouge will perform in Fortaleza in 2018, soon after the date of the show was announced for January 27, 2018. On December 5 the show was officially announced, being held at the Center of Events of Ceará, in addition to revealing the value of the tickets and the date of beginning of the sales.

Soon after the announcement of the show in Fortaleza, on December 7, the Rouge announced show in other three Brazilian cities, Florianópolis, Curitiba and Porto Alegre. In Florianópolis the group will perform at the Stage Music Park, on February 9 on Friday of Carnaval. In Curitiba the group will be performing at Live Curitiba on March 9. And in Porto Alegre will be presented on March 10 at Pepsi On Stage. On December 9, it was the turn to announce the Brasilia show that will be held on March 24 at Net Live Brasília.

Setlist 
The repertoire below is constituted of the show done on February 10, 2018 in Florianópolis, not being representative of all the concerts.

 "Blá Blá Blá"
 "Bailando"
 "Quero Estar Com Você"
 "Fantasma"
 "Eu Quero Acreditar"
 "Não Dá pra Resistir"
 "Beijo Molhado"
 "1000 Segredos" / "Sou o Que Sou" / "Pá Pá Lá Lá" / "Depois Que Tudo Mudou"
 "Cidade Triste"
 "Um Anjo Veio Me Falar"
 "Sem Você"
 "Me Faz Feliz"
 "C'est La Vie"
 "Quando Chega a Noite"(Interlude)
 "Vem Habib (Wala Wala)" (Interlude of "Baby Boy" by Beyoncé)
 "Vem Cair na Zueira"
 "Vem Dançar"  (Interlude of "Wanna Be Startin' Somethin'" by Michael Jackson) / "Popstar" (Interlude of "Uptown Funk" by Mark Ronson and Bruno Mars)
 "Tudo Outra Vez"
 "Nunca Deixe de Sonhar"
 "Hoje Eu Sei"
 "Olha Só"
 "O Que o Amor Me Faz"
 "Brilha La Luna"
 "Ragatanga"
 "Bailando" (Reprise)
 "Tudo é Rouge" (Outro)

Shows

Cancelled Dates

Notes

References

2018 concert tours
Rouge (group) concert tours
Reunion concert tours